Todd Withers (born May 6, 1996) is an American professional basketball player for the Texas Legends of the NBA G League. He is also contracted with the Otago Nuggets of the New Zealand National Basketball League (NZNBL). He attended and played college basketball at Queens University of Charlotte.

Early life and high school
Withers grew up in Greensboro, North Carolina and attended Northeast Guilford High School in McLeansville, North Carolina, where he was a member of the basketball, football, tennis and track and field teams. He was named All-Mid State Conference as a junior and senior, when he was also named the conference most valuable player.

College career
Withers played four seasons for the Queens Royals, starting the final three years. He was named second team All-South Atlantic Conference (SAC) after averaging 10.7 points and 7.0 rebounds in his junior season. As a senior, Withers averaged 13.6 points, eight rebounds and 1.7 blocks per game and was named first team All-SAC and Division II All-America by the National Association of Basketball Coaches.

Professional career

Grand Rapids Drive (2018–2020)
On October 11, 2018, Withers signed with the Grand Rapids Drive of the NBA G League. He averaged 6.9 points, 5.6 rebounds, 1.1 assists, 1.0 steals, and 0.8 blocks per game in his rookie season with the Drive. On July 22, 2019, Withers was signed by Grand Rapids' NBA affiliate, the Detroit Pistons, to an Exhibit 10 contract, but was waived near the end of the preseason on October 17, 2019. He returned to Grand Rapids for a second season and averaged 10.7 points, five rebounds and 1.1 assists per game.

Fortitudo Bologna (2020–2021)
On July 2, 2020, Withers signed with Fortitudo Bologna of Italian Lega Basket Serie A (LBA).

Adelaide 36ers (2021–2022)
On August 5, 2021, Withers signed with the Adelaide 36ers for the 2021–22 NBL season. He averaged 8.3 points and 3.8 rebounds per game.

Otago Nuggets and Texas Legends (2022–present)
On April 22, 2022, Withers signed with the Otago Nuggets for the 2022 New Zealand NBL season. He helped the Nuggets win the championship with an 81–73 win over the Auckland Tuatara in the grand final.

After initially signing in Lithuania, Wither joined the Texas Legends of the NBA G League on December 26, 2022.

On March 8, 2023, Withers re-signed with the Nuggets for the 2023 New Zealand NBL season.

References

External links
NBL profile
Queens Royals bio

1996 births
Living people
Adelaide 36ers players
American expatriate basketball people in Australia
American expatriate basketball people in Italy
American expatriate basketball people in New Zealand
American men's basketball players
Basketball players from North Carolina
Grand Rapids Drive players
Fortitudo Pallacanestro Bologna players
Otago Nuggets players
Power forwards (basketball)
Queens Royals men's basketball players
Small forwards
Texas Legends players